Sphenomorphus derooyae  is a species of skink, a lizard in the family Scincidae. The species is native to Oceania.

Geographic range
S. derooyae is found in New Guinea and in the Bismarck Archipelago, including Admiralty Islands, New Britain, and New Ireland.

Habitat

Reproduction
S. derooyae is oviparous.

Taxonomy
S. derooyae may be a species complex, and the proper name for populations outside the New Guinean mainland is uncertain.

Etymology
The specific name, derooyae, is in honor of Dutch zoologist Nelly de Rooij (spelled "de Rooy" by de Jong).

References

Further reading
Daan S, Hillenius D (1966). "Catalogue of the Type Specimens of Amphibians and Reptiles in the Zoological Museum, Amsterdam". Beaufortia 13: 117–144. (Lygosoma derooyae, p. 132).
de Jong JK (1927). "Reptiles from Dutch New Guinea". Nova Guinea 15 (3): 296–318. (Lygosoma derooyae, new species).
Mys B (1988). "The zoogeography of the scincid lizards from North Papua New Guinea (Reptilia: Scincidae). I. The distribution of the species". Bulletin de l'Institut Royal des Sciences Naturelles de Belgique, Biologie 58: 127–183. (Sphenomorphus derooijae, new combination, p. 142).
Pyron RA, Burbrink FT (2013). "Early origin of viviparity and multiple reversions to oviparity in squamate reptiles". Ecology Letters 17 (1): 13–21. (Spenomorphus derooyae).

derooyae
Reptiles of Papua New Guinea
Reptiles of Western New Guinea
Reptiles described in 1927
Taxa named by Jan Komelis De Jong
Skinks of New Guinea